Murtaza Ally Mangungu (born 29 September 1959) is a Tanzanian CCM politician and Member of Parliament for Kilwa North constituency since 2010. chairman of simba sports club in tanzania from 2021

References

Living people
Chama Cha Mapinduzi MPs
Tanzanian MPs 2010–2015
1959 births